A kissing booth is an attraction, usually at a carnival, where the person running the booth kisses other people, often to raise funds for charity. There are newspaper articles dating back to at least the early 1900s advertising upcoming kissing booths and their "osculatory favors". A 1918 article from The Garden Island newspaper states, "All the horors [sic] of war disappears for the man with a roll of bills at the Red Cross kissing booth -- that is 'till his wife sees him."

Notable examples
At a national convention of the American Library Association in Dallas in 1971, LGBT equality campaigner Barbara Gittings staffed a kissing booth underneath the banner "Hug a Homosexual," with a "women only" side and a "men only" side. When no one took advantage of it, she and Alma Routsong kissed in front of rolling television cameras. In describing its success, despite most of the reaction being negative, Gittings said, "We needed to get an audience. So we decided, let's show gay love live. We were offering free—mind you, free—same-sex kisses and hugs. Let me tell you, the aisles were mobbed, but no one came into the booth to get a free hug. So we hugged and kissed each other. It was shown twice on the evening news, once again in the morning. It put us on the map."

American musician Marnie Stern ran a kissing booth at some of her concerts in 2008.

See also
Dunk tank
List of amusement rides

References

External links

 A fundraiser in the buff at Tampa Bay Times
 Alberta's bear-kissing booth back in business at CTV
 Lip service at Salon
 Hilda, 96, raises cash as she sells kisses at Cambs Times

Carnival games
Kissing